The Cabinet Office Briefing Rooms (COBR) are meeting rooms in the Cabinet Office in London. These rooms are used for committees which co-ordinate the actions of government bodies in response to national or regional crises, or during overseas events with major implications for the UK. It is popularly referred to as COBRA.

The facility 
The Cabinet Office Briefing Rooms are a group of meeting rooms in the Cabinet Office at 70 Whitehall in London, often used for different committees which co-ordinate the actions of bodies within the Government of the United Kingdom in response to instances of national or regional crisis, or during events abroad with major implications for the UK. It is popularly, but not officially referred to as COBRA, even when the acronym is spelt out by officials. Other meeting rooms in the Cabinet Office are not part of the COBR facility, including the old Treasury Board Room, which is labelled "Conference Room A", located in Kent's Treasury, a different part of the Cabinet Office building.

A single photo of one of the rooms in COBR was released in 2010 in response to a Freedom of Information Act request.

The committees 
The composition of a ministerial-level meeting in COBR depends on the nature of the incident but it is usually chaired by the Prime Minister or another senior minister, with other key ministers as appropriate, city mayors and representatives of relevant external organisations such as the National Police Chiefs' Council and the Local Government Association.

The first COBR meeting took place in the 1970s to oversee the government's response to the 1972 miners' strike.  Other events that have led to meetings being convened include the 1980 Iranian Embassy siege, the 2001 foot and mouth outbreak, the 11 September 2001 attacks, the 7 July 2005 London bombings, the refugee crisis in Calais, the 2015 Paris attacks, the Manchester Arena bombing, and the COVID-19 pandemic.

In 2009, former senior police officer Andy Hayman, who sat on a committee after the 7 July 2005 London bombings and at other intervals from 2005 to 2007, was highly critical of its workings in his book The Terrorist Hunters.

The Scientific Advisory Group for Emergencies (SAGE) is a sub-committee of COBR.

See also 
 National Security Council
 Civil Contingencies Secretariat
 Cobra (British TV series)

References 

Emergency management in the United Kingdom
Cabinet Office (United Kingdom)
Individual rooms
National government buildings in London